Essential Forces, or the Essential Forces Fountain, is a fountain outside Portland, Oregon's Moda Center, in the United States. The water feature was created by WET Design of Los Angeles, and its stone pillars once shot out fire. It is "computerized" and was donated to the city by Paul Allen. The fountain was completed in 1995 and has 500 water jets.

References

1995 establishments in Oregon
Fountains in Portland, Oregon
Lloyd District, Portland, Oregon
Northeast Portland, Oregon
Outdoor sculptures in Portland, Oregon
Stone sculptures in Oregon